John Hollinger (born May 17, 1971) is the former Vice President of Basketball Operations for the Memphis Grizzlies of the National Basketball Association (NBA) and current Senior NBA columnist at The Athletic. 

Prior to December 2012, he was an analyst and writer for ESPN, primarily covering the NBA. Hollinger grew up in Mahwah, New Jersey, and is a 1993 graduate of the University of Virginia.

Hollinger developed the website Alleyoop in 1996, initially as a hobby and sounding board for his musings on the game. Touting the site as "The Basketball Page for Thinking Fans," Hollinger followed in the footsteps of noted analysts Dean Oliver and Bob Bellotti in a quest for the ultimate basketball statistic.

During ''Alleyoops early years, Hollinger experimented with offensive and defensive ratings (points created and allowed per 100 possessions) in much the same way as Oliver, as a means of quantifying a player's overall contribution to his team. While the methods were hardly groundbreaking, Hollinger's writing style and incisive commentary caught the eye of such industry luminaries as Web Magazine, and The Wall Street Journal.

Hollinger spent the next three years as the sports editor at OregonLive.com, developing an intimate understanding of the inner workings of the NBA, both as a game and a business. It was during his OregonLive years that Hollinger developed his Player Efficiency Rating (PER), a figure that attempts to combine all of a player's contributions into one number.

After his stint in Portland, Hollinger was hired as the basketball editor at SI.com, Sports Illustrated'''s online sister site. In 2002, Hollinger released the first Pro Basketball Prospectus which was his first work published in print.

Hollinger has authored three more Prospectuses, now called Pro Basketball Forecasts. He left Sports Illustrated to write for ESPN.com in the summer of 2005, and his weekly columns were available through their "insider" subscription service. Additionally, Hollinger wrote for the New York Suns sports section.

Hollinger has appeared every year on the basketball analytics panel at the annual MIT Sloan Sports Analytics Conference.

Hollinger game score
As an extension of the Player Efficiency Rating, Hollinger also developed a simpler formula that quantifies how impressive a player's individual performance is in a given game. The Hollinger Game Score formula is:

PTS + 0.4 * FG - 0.7 * FGA - 0.4*(FTA - FT) + 0.7 * ORB + 0.3 * DRB + STL + 0.7 * AST + 0.7 * BLK - 0.4 * PF - TOV.  Per

Game Score was created to give a rough measure of a player's productivity for a single game. The scale is similar to that of points scored, (40 is an outstanding performance, 10 is an average performance, etc.).

The entire modern box score of the player is needed for calculation, including offensive and defensive rebounding, steals, blocks and turnovers, so the Hollinger Game Score can only be applied to games played since the 1978 season.

References

External links 
 Hollinger's ESPN Insider archive
 Hollinger's articles at SI
 Basketball-Reference.com, includes many of Hollinger's statistics
 KnickerBlogger.net, home of constantly updated PER's

Living people
The New York Sun people
1971 births
Place of birth missing (living people)
People from Mahwah, New Jersey
Sportswriters from New York (state)
Memphis Grizzlies executives